Pelagodes spiniseparati is a moth of the family Geometridae first described by Jeremy Daniel Holloway in 1996. It is found in Peninsular Malaysia and Borneo.

The wingspan of the male is 14–15 mm and the wings are pale bluish green. Fasciae clearly defined.

References

Moths of Asia
Moths described in 1996